Tall nightshade is a common name for several plants and may refer to:

Solanum chenopodioides, native to South America
Solanum furcatum, native to South America
Solanum nigrescens